is a Japanese post-production company for films, television programmes and commercials, etc., established in 1935 and headquartered in Shinagawa, Tokyo, Japan. It is a subsidiary of Imagica Group.

History 
Imagica started theatrical film developing business.

On 1 April 2004, Imagica and Robot Communications co-established Imagica Robot Holdings Inc., and Imagica became a part of this company.

References

External links 
 
 

Mass media companies established in 1935
Mass media companies based in Tokyo
Film production companies of Japan
Special effects companies
Imagica Robot Holdings
Television and film post-production companies
Japanese companies established in 1935